Ferocactus pottsii is a species of Ferocactus from Mexico. The specific epithet has also been spelt pottsi.

References

External links
 
 

pottsii
Flora of Mexico
Plants described in 1961